Joe Preston is an EP by then-Melvins bassist Joe Preston, released in 1992 through Boner Records. It is believed that he is the only performer on the record and that the other two performers are a hoax; "Salty Green" is a known pseudonym of Preston, also seen on the "Night Goat" single. Denial Fiend was a pseudonym for Martin Ain who was in the band Hellhammer.

The cover art for the album is a parody of the cover art from Ace Frehley's 1978 solo album. The credit for Marina Sirtis as "Counselor" is a reference to the actress that played Counselor Deanna Troi on the television series Star Trek: The Next Generation.

It's worth noting that Joe Preston is credited for vocals albeit the whole album is instrumental, intermixed with several voice clips sourced from elsewhere.

Buzz Osborne has gone on record to say this is one of his least favorite Melvins releases, according to a CMJ New Music article in 2005:

Track listing

Personnel
Joe Preston – vocals, mixing
Denial Fiend – Hellish crossfire on wooden coffins
Salty Green – Chapman stick / Hands First Flower
Jeff Brangley – producer
Jonathan Burnside – engineer, mixing
Harvey Bennett Stafford – cover and inside painting
Marina Sirtis – counseling

References

1992 EPs
Melvins EPs
Boner Records albums
Instrumental rock EPs